Cəfərabad (also, Jafarabad) is a village and municipality in the Shaki District of Azerbaijan. It has a population of 1,937. The municipality consists of the villages of Jafarabad and Cholagly.

References 

Populated places in Shaki District